Encephalus is a genus of beetles belonging to the family Staphylinidae.

The species of this genus are found in Eurasia, New Zealand and Northern America.

Species:
 Encephalus aberrans (Cameron, 1939) 
 Encephalus americanus Seevers, 1951

References

Staphylinidae
Staphylinidae genera